The Lucas L8, also called the L 8 and L-8, is a French amateur-built aircraft that was designed by Emile Lucas of Lagny-le-Sec. The aircraft is supplied in the form of plans for amateur construction.

Design and development
The L8 is the most popular Lucas design. It features a cantilever low-wing, a two-seats-in-side-by-side configuration enclosed cockpit under a bubble canopy, fixed or optionally retractable tricycle landing gear and a single engine in tractor configuration.

The aircraft is made from sheet aluminum.

Specifications (L8 retractable)

References

External links

Homebuilt aircraft
Single-engined tractor aircraft
Low-wing aircraft
French civil utility aircraft